Immortality Lessons is a live album by Cul de Sac, released in 2002 through Strange Attractors Audio House.

Track listing

Personnel 
Cul de Sac
Robin Amos – synthesizers, sampler, autoharp
Michael Bloom – bass guitar
Ofer Inbar – production
Glenn Jones – guitar, bouzouki
Jon Proudman – drums

References 

2002 live albums
Cul de Sac (band) albums
Albums recorded at Brandeis University